Jackie Walker (born November 3, 1962) is a former an American football linebacker who played for the Tampa Bay Buccaneers of the National Football League (NFL). He was the 28th player selected in the 1986 NFL Draft, the first player drafted in the second round of a year in which there were only 27 first-round picks. His selection was controversial, as he did not score particularly well in the pre-draft combines, and there were more-heralded linebackers still on the board. Walker attended Carroll High School in Monroe, Louisiana.  He was a latecomer to organized sports, not playing football until high school coaches and his older brother convinced him to join the team in his senior year of high school.  A quick and aggressive player, he was a starter all four years at Jackson State University, where he also played power forward for the basketball team. In his senior year, he led the team with 131 tackles, was named to two All-American teams, and was named Southwestern Athletic Conference Defensive Player of the Year. While the Buccaneers staff were impressed with his raw talent and saw him as a potential Ted Hendricks-type player, the fans were critical of the selection of a player with so little training and experience. Walker started only nine games for the Buccaneers, all in 1987. Although popular with teammates and a standout on special teams, he never worked his way into the regular lineup. Buccaneers coach Ray Perkins at one point toyed with the idea of taking advantage of his athleticism by converting him to tight end, but dropped the idea due to lack of interest from Walker. When Plan B free agency began in 1989, Walker was one of the players allowed to leave. He was signed by the New York Jets in 1989 after being left unprotected by the Buccaneers, but was cut from the Jets in training camp. He later played for the Cincinnati Rockers, Miami Hooters, and Orlando Predators of the Arena Football League.

Awards
Southwestern Athletic Conference most valuable defensive player, 1985
1st Team All-American, 1985

References

1962 births
Living people
American football linebackers
American football tight ends
American men's basketball players
Basketball players from Louisiana
Cincinnati Rockers players
Jackson State Tigers basketball players
Jackson State Tigers football players
Miami Hooters players
Orlando Predators players
Players of American football from Louisiana
Sportspeople from Monroe, Louisiana
Tampa Bay Buccaneers players